Francis Anthony Mossman (14 April 1988 – 14 August 2021) was a New Zealand actor based in Australia. He was best known for his portrayal of Stevie Hughes in The Horizon and Vitus in Spartacus: Vengeance.

Biography 
Francis Mossman was born on 14 April 1988, in Auckland, New Zealand, to Reginald Mossman and Maria Abad. He had two brothers. In 2012, Mossman migrated to Sydney, Australia.

Mossman died on 14 August 2021, at the age of 33.

Career 
Mossman appeared in the New Zealand kids' series Amazing Extraordinary Friends, and the New Zealand soap Shortland Street. He also appeared in three episodes of Starz series Spartacus: Vengeance.

Mossman starred as Stevie Hughes in The Horizon. He reprised his role as Stevie in the television movie The Horizon, directed by Stephan Elliott. Mossman also featured in the Australian feature film Ruben Guthrie.

Filmography

Television 
 Shortland Street (2006) – Taylor
 Amazing Extraordinary Friends (2006) – Nigel
 Spartacus: Vengeance (2012) – Vitus
 The Horizon (2013 - 2017) – Stevie Hughes

Films 
 Ruben Guthrie (2015) – Lorenzo Oil
 Pig Boy (2017) (short) – Dylan
 Dis-Connect (2020) (short) – Luke

References

External links 
 

1988 births
2021 deaths
New Zealand male actors
New Zealand male models
New Zealand people of Filipino descent
New Zealand emigrants to Australia
21st-century New Zealand male actors
21st-century Filipino male actors
People from Auckland
People from Sydney
People from Puerto Princesa
Filipino male models
Filipino people of New Zealand descent